Jay Spurgeon (born July 5, 1976) is a former Major League Baseball pitcher who appeared in seven games for the Baltimore Orioles during the 2000 season.

Career
Spurgeon was selected by the Orioles in the 8th round of the 1997 Major League Baseball draft.

References

External links

1976 births
Living people
Major League Baseball pitchers
Baseball players from California
Baltimore Orioles players
Hawaii Rainbow Warriors baseball players
Bluefield Orioles players
Regina Cyclones players
Delmarva Shorebirds players
Frederick Keys players
Rochester Red Wings players
Bowie Baysox players